Park Bridge is a road bridge in Aberdeenshire, Scotland which crosses the River Dee. It is currently open to pedestrians and cyclists, and it also carried vehicular traffic until February 2019.

History
Park Bridge was built in 1854 by the Deeside Railway to improve southern access to its line and Park railway station. Until 1962, the bridge was tolled. On 16 April 1971, the bridge became Category A Listed.

The bridge was closed to vehicular traffic in February 2019 following the discovery of structural defects during a routine inspection.

Construction
The deck is constructed from wood. The bridge was designed by engineer John Willett and its ironwork was manufactured by James Abernethy of Aberdeen.

References

Bridges in Aberdeenshire
Bridges completed in 1854
Road bridges in Scotland
Former toll bridges in Scotland
Bridges across the River Dee, Aberdeenshire